NGC 7537 is a spiral galaxy located in the equatorial constellation of Pisces, about 1.5° to the NNW of Gamma Piscium. It was first documented by German-born astronomer William Herschel on Aug 30, 1785. J. L. E. Dreyer described it as, "very faint, considerably small, round, brighter middle, southwestern of 2".

This object forms a pair with the nearly edge-on barred spiral galaxy NGC 7541, and the two show signs of interaction.

A Type II supernova designated SN 2002gd was detected by multiple independent observers beginning October 5, 2002.

References

External links
 

Unbarred spiral galaxies
Pisces (constellation)
7537
12442
70786